James William Norton-Kyshe (1855–1920) was a British barrister and legal author. The Registrar of the Supreme Court of Hong Kong from 1895 to 1904, he published a number of law books including the compendious and oft-cited History of the Laws and Courts of Hong Kong (1898).

Early life
Norton-Kyshe was born in 1855, the second son of Henry Kyshe and Esther Norton.

Career
Norton-Kyshe commenced work as a clerk in the office of his stepfather, James Henry Slade, a solicitor. In 1871, at the age of 16, he entered the Colonial Service as a clerk to the Procureur General and Advocate General of Mauritius. After holding various appointments in Mauritius, he was promoted to the position of Deputy Registrar in Penang. He passed exams in both written and spoken Malay.

He was called to the Bar by Lincoln's Inn in 1888. In 1892, he was appointed Sheriff of Singapore and, in 1895, Registrar of the Supreme Court of Hong Kong. He was compulsorily retired over allegations of misconduct in 1904 and returned to England.

Later life and death
Norton-Kyshe appears to have ceased publishing after his retirement. He died on 1 March 1920, four years after his estate had gone into administration under the Lunacy Acts.

Books
Norton-Kyshe was a prodigious author and published the following books:
 .
 .
 .
 .
 .
 , 2 volumes.
 .
 .
 .

See also
 The Dictionary of Legal Quotations

Notes

References
 

 

1855 births
1920 deaths
British barristers
British legal scholars
British Hong Kong judges
Members of Lincoln's Inn
Straits Settlements judges